Admiral John Surman Carden (15 August 1771 – 22 April 1858) was an officer of the British Royal Navy in the early nineteenth century. Although the majority of his service was against the French during the Napoleonic Wars, he is best remembered for the action of 25 October 1812, an engagement against a larger American frigate during the War of 1812 in which his ship  was captured. Carden was criticised for the loss of his ship, specifically his handling of the vessel during the action. Following his defeat in October 1812 he never served again in an active capacity, but he remained in the Navy and continued to gradually rise though the ranks in retirement, eventually becoming a full admiral before his death in 1858.

Life
Carden was born in 1771, the son of Army officer Major Carden of Tredington Court in Tewkesbury. Carden spent his childhood at home, his mother refusing to allow him to become a pageboy in the household of Queen Charlotte and also resisted orders to enlist him in his father's regiment at the age of eight. Both his parents died while he was young: his mother died aged only 26, while his father was killed in action during the American Revolutionary War. Carden was educated privately until he was 17, when he enlisted in the Royal Navy in 1788, joining  under Captain Charles Thompson and later moving to the frigate  under Captain Isaac Smith. In 1790 he became a midshipman and in 1793, at the outbreak of the French Revolutionary Wars, he moved to the ship of the line  under Captain George Cranfield Berkeley.

Marlborough served in the Channel Fleet, and in 1794 was heavily engaged at the battle of the Glorious First of June, at which Carden was badly wounded in an ammunition explosion, suffering permanent damage to his eyesight. In 1798 he briefly moved to Thompson's flagship  before becoming a lieutenant in the frigate  under Captain Thomas Byam Martin.

In 1799, Carden took command of the armed storeship , operating off the Netherlands and subsequently the Vendée region of France. He later convoyed troopships to the Red Sea in support of the Egyptian campaign, and was commended for clearing a gunpowder store on the burning transport Bombay, saving many lives. In 1806, Carden became a post captain, but was not given command of a ship until August 1808, when he took over the massive 110-gun . In Ville de Paris he assisted in the evacuation of the British Army from Spain, following the Battle of Corunna in January 1809.

In the ensuing battle, Macedonian was severely damaged and suffered 104 casualties before Carden surrendered to the American ship. Macedonian was taken back to the United States, and on his return to Britain, Carden was subject to the usual court martial for the loss of his ship. Although acquitted of any culpability for the loss of his frigate, Carden was criticised for his handling of the ship during the battle and did not serve at sea again. However parliament soon resounded with his praises; and, among other marks of respect, he was honoured with the freedom of the cities of Worcester and Gloucester, and of the borough of Tewkesbury.

Very little is known of Carden's life beyond that he was once married and had a daughter, Jemima born c. 1800. She married the Rev R W H Biederman. Carden remained in the Navy despite the lengthy period of inaction and in 1836 was superannuated, a form of retirement. He was promoted to rear-admiral the same year and although he was subsequently reinstated in the Navy and continued to receive promotions based on his seniority, he did not hold any further naval position. He died in Antrim in 1858, at the age of 86 with the rank of full admiral.

References

Further reading

 
Carden, John Surman (1912).  A curtail'd memoir …  Ed Atkinson, C T. Oxford.

1771 births
1858 deaths
Royal Navy personnel of the French Revolutionary Wars
Royal Navy personnel of the Napoleonic Wars
Royal Navy admirals
People from Tewkesbury
Royal Navy personnel who were court-martialled